William Edward "Wid" Conroy (April 5, 1877 – December 6, 1959) was an American Major League Baseball player active during the first decade of the 20th century.

Career
Born in Philadelphia, Pennsylvania on April 5, 1877, Conroy made his major league debut on April 25, 1901, with the Milwaukee Brewers at the age of 24. He played his last game on October 5, 1911, for the Washington Senators, retiring at 34 years.  Standing at 5' 9" (177 cm) and weighing 158 lb. (72 kg), Conroy epitomized the role of a utility man, playing every infield and outfield position in his 11-season career.  He played for the Milwaukee Brewers (1901), Pittsburgh Pirates (1902), New York Yankees (1903–1908), Washington Senators (1909–1911).

Conroy began his career as a shortstop, replacing Honus Wagner with Paterson in the Atlantic League, but was struck by malarial fever and dropped from the team. In 1900 Connie Mack invited him to try out for the Western Association team he would field in Milwaukee and transfer to Philadelphia when the American League began as a major circuit; Conroy won the last spot on the roster. Conroy was the first-string shortstop of the NL champion 1902 Pirates but became a third baseman when he returned to the AL with the Highlanders (later the Yankees) in 1903. He led AL third basemen twice in total chances per game. His 22-year career in pro baseball ended as a Philadelphia Phillies coach in 1922.

During his prime, Conroy consistently ranked in the top ten in most offensive categories as well as in stolen bases. He was an opening day starter for the New York Highlanders during the first five years of the team's existence (1903–1907). Batting and throwing right-handed, Conroy led the New York Highlanders with 4 home runs in 1906 and was fifth in the league overall. He also stole 41 bases in 1907, second only to Ty Cobb, who swiped 49 that year.  On September 25, 1911, he set an AL record with 13 total chances at 3B in a 3–2 loss to Cleveland.
In 1,377 career games, Conroy batted .248 with 22 home runs and 452 RBIs.

Legacy and death
In the 1945 BBWAA Hall of Fame voting, Conroy obtained 1 vote and a percentage of .4.  Wid Conroy died on December 6, 1959, in Mount Holly, New Jersey, and is buried at Mount Carmel Cemetery, in Moorestown, New Jersey.

See also
List of Major League Baseball career stolen bases leaders

References

External links

1877 births
1959 deaths
Major League Baseball third basemen
Baseball players from Philadelphia
Milwaukee Brewers (1901) players
Pittsburgh Pirates players
New York Highlanders players
Washington Senators (1901–1960) players
Philadelphia Phillies coaches
Minor league baseball managers
Rochester Hustlers players
Elmira Colonels players
Richmond Virginians (minor league) players
Burials in New Jersey